William Bradshaw (born April 1884) was an English football player and manager. Bradshaw played at both professional and international levels as a left half.

Career

Club career
Born in Padiham, Bradshaw began his career with Padiham and Accrington Stanley. Bradshaw was a left-half, but was extremely adept at joining the attack and was referred to in one report as "being as good as having a sixth forward"; he was also an expert penalty-taker. He signed for Blackburn Rovers in May 1903 for a fee of £20, and spent 17 years at the club, scoring 36 goals in 386 appearances in the Football League before leaving in 1920. During his time at the Ewood Park club, he helped them win the Football League championship in 1912 and 1914.

In April 1920, he was released by Blackburn to become player-manager of Rochdale, but left that position in September of the same year.

International career
Bradshaw made his international debut in February 1910, and earned a total of four caps between then and 1913. He also represented the Football League on three occasions.

Honours
Blackburn Rovers
Football League championship: 1911–12 and 1913–14

References

External links

1884 births
Year of death missing
English footballers
England international footballers
English football managers
Padiham F.C. players
Accrington Stanley F.C. (1891) players
Blackburn Rovers F.C. players
Rochdale A.F.C. players
English Football League players
Rochdale A.F.C. managers
Association football wing halves
English Football League representative players